Nikolay Manchev (Bulgarian Cyrillic: Николай Манчев; born 4 January 1985 in Plovdiv) is a Bulgarian footballer who plays as a midfielder for Bratsigovo.

Career
Nikolay Manchev started his career in his home town of Plovdiv, with local team Maritsa. In June 2007, he joined Botev Plovdiv. He had a contract with Botev to 30 June 2010. Manchev made his official debut with Botev in a match against Spartak Varna on 11 August 2007. He played for 90 minutes. The result of the match was 2-2. On 24 November 2007, he scored his first goal for Botev against Vihren Sandanski. He netted in the 63rd minute. The result of the match was 1-0. He joined CSKA Sofia as a free agent with his teammate Todor Timonov on 15 July 2009. He terminated his contract with CSKA by mutual consent in October 2010 and returned to Botev Plovdiv.

In July 2017, Manchev joined Bratsigovo in A RFG Pazardzhik.

References

External links
 footmercato profile

1985 births
Living people
Footballers from Plovdiv
Bulgarian footballers
Association football midfielders
FC Maritsa Plovdiv players
FC Hebar Pazardzhik players
Botev Plovdiv players
PFC CSKA Sofia players
FC Haskovo players
FC Oborishte players
First Professional Football League (Bulgaria) players
Second Professional Football League (Bulgaria) players